Donghai Road Station, also known as Donghailu Station, is a station of Line 9 of the Tianjin Metro. It started operations on 28 March 2004.

The station was severely damaged on 12 August 2015 when a series of explosions occurred at the nearby Port of Tianjin. The roof of the station collapsed. As a result of the damage as well as the ongoing situation at the blast site, the station was closed for repairs from 13 August 2015 and reopened on 31 December 2016.

References

External links 

Railway stations in Tianjin
Railway stations in China opened in 2004
Tianjin Metro stations